Christ Church Cathedral, more formally The Cathedral of the Holy Trinity, is the cathedral of the United Dioceses of Dublin and Glendalough and the cathedral of the ecclesiastical province of the United Provinces of Dublin and Cashel in the (Anglican) Church of Ireland. It is situated in Dublin, Ireland, and is the elder of the capital city's two medieval cathedrals, the other being St Patrick's Cathedral.

The cathedral was founded in the early 11th century under the Viking king Sitric Silkenbeard. It was rebuilt in stone in the late 12th century under the Norman potentate Strongbow, and considerably enlarged in the early 13th century, using Somerset stones and craftsmen. A partial collapse in the 16th century left it in poor shape and the building was extensively renovated and rebuilt in the late 19th century, giving it the form it has today, including the tower, flying buttresses, and distinctive covered footbridge.

Overview and history

Overview

Christ Church is officially claimed as the seat (cathedra) of both the Church of Ireland and Roman Catholic archbishops of Dublin. In law, and in fact, it has been the cathedral of only the Church of Ireland's Archbishop of Dublin since the English Reformation. Though nominally claiming Christ Church as his cathedral, the Roman Catholic Archbishop of Dublin uses St Mary's in Marlborough Street in Dublin as his pro-cathedral (acting cathedral).

Christ Church Cathedral is located in the former heart of medieval Dublin, next to Wood Quay at the end of Lord Edward Street. However, a major dual carriageway building scheme around it separated it from the original medieval street pattern which once surrounded it, with its original architectural context (at the centre of a maze of small buildings and streets) lost due to road-building and the demolition of the older residential quarter at Wood Quay. As a result, the cathedral now appears dominant in isolation behind new civil offices along the quays, out of its original medieval context. The cathedral is used as the setting for filming from time to time.

Christ Church is the only one of the three cathedrals or acting cathedrals which can be seen clearly from the River Liffey.

First cathedral 
The cathedral was founded probably sometime after 1028 when King Sitric Silkenbeard, the Hiberno-Norse king of Dublin made a pilgrimage to Rome. The first bishop of this new Dublin diocese was Dúnán or Donat, and the diocese was at that time a small island of land surrounded by the much larger Diocese of Glendalough, and was for a time answerable to Canterbury rather than to the Irish Church hierarchy.  The church was built on the high ground overlooking the Viking settlement at Wood Quay and Sitric gave the "lands of Baldoyle, Raheny and Portrane for its maintenance." Of the four old Celtic Christian churches reputed to have existed around Dublin, only one, dedicated to St. Martin of Tours, lay within the walls of the Viking city, and so Christ Church was one of just two churches for the whole city.

The cathedral was originally staffed by secular clergy. The second Bishop of Dublin introduced the Benedictines. In 1163, Christ Church was converted to a priory of the Regular Order of Arrosian Canons (Reformed Augustinian Rule) by the second Archbishop of Dublin, later saint, Laurence O'Toole, who adhered to the rule himself; it was subsequently headed by an Augustinian prior, who ranked as the second ecclesiastical figure of the diocese, and not a dean, until re-establishment in 1541.

Norman period
Henry II attended the Christmas service at the cathedral in 1171. According to the cathedral guidebook, this was the first time Henry received Holy Communion following the murder of Thomas Becket by Henry's knights in Canterbury.

In the 1180s, Strongbow and other Norman magnates helped to fund a complete rebuilding of Christ Church, initially a wooden building, in stone, comprising the construction of a choir, choir aisles and transepts, the crypt and chapels to St. Edmund and St. Mary and St. Lô.

A chapel to St Laurence O'Toole was added in the 13th century and much of the extant nave was built in the 1230s. Its design was inspired by the architecture of the English western school of Gothic, and its wrought stones—of a Somersetshire oolite—were sculpted and laid by craftsmen from the same area.

In 1300 Richard de Ferings, Archbishop of Dublin arranged an agreement between the two cathedrals, the Pacis Compostio, which acknowledged both as cathedrals and made some provisions to accommodate their shared status (see below for more on this).

In the 1350s a major extension was undertaken by John de St Paul, Archbishop of Dublin, 1349–1362. By 1358, the nave of the cathedral was partly in use for secular purposes and a "long quire" was added, extending the old choir area by around 10 metres. St Paul also installed an organ. His works were destroyed by the major rebuilding project in the 1870s. He was buried under the high altar.

In 1480 the wealthy judge William Sutton bequeathed all his lands and silver to the cathedral.

The cathedral was the location of the purported coronation, in 1487, of Lambert Simnel, a boy pretender who sought unsuccessfully to depose Henry VII of England, as "King Edward VI".

The choir school was founded in 1493.

Reformation period
In 1539, King Henry VIII converted the priory to a cathedral with a dean and chapter and worked to ensure Christ Church adhered to his new church structure. His immediate successor, Edward VI of England, in 1547, provided funds for an increase in cathedral staffing and annual royal funding for the choir school.

King Edward VI formally suppressed St Patrick's Cathedral and, on 25 April 1547, its silver, jewels and ornaments were transferred to the dean and chapter of Christ Church. This episode ended with a late document of Queen Mary's reign, a deed dated 27 April 1558, comprising a release or receipt by Thomas Leverous, dean, and the chapter of St Patrick's, of the "goods, chattels, musical instruments, etc." belonging to that cathedral and which had been in the possession of the dean and chapter of Christ Church.

Queen Mary I of England, and later James I of England, also increased Christ Church's endowment. Meanwhile, in 1551, divine service was sung for the first time in Ireland in English instead of Latin. In 1560, the Bible was first read in English.

Kingdom of Ireland

The foundations of the nave, resting in peat, slipped in 1562, bringing down the south wall and the arched stone roof (the north wall, which visibly leans, survived, and largely dates back to 1230).  Partial repairs were carried out but much of the debris was simply levelled and new flooring was built over it until 1871. In 1620 the English-born judge Luke Gernon  observed that Christchurch was in a better state of repair than St. Patrick's; he does not seem to have been overly impressed by either.

In the 17th century, both parliament and the law courts met in buildings erected alongside Christ Church. King James II himself presided over a state opening of parliament in that location. However, parliament and the law courts both moved elsewhere: the law courts to the newly built Four Courts on the riverfront, and Parliament to Chichester House in Hoggen Green, into the building which is now The Bank of Ireland, College Green.

Like nearby St Patrick's, the building was in poor condition for much of the 19th century. After the building was declared unsafe and no longer fit for use, some limited works were carried out by Matthew Price (architect) between 1829 and 1831.

19th and 20th centuries

The cathedral was extensively renovated and rebuilt from 1871 to 1878 by George Edmund Street, with the sponsorship of the distiller Henry Roe of Mount Anville. The great 14th-century choir was demolished and a new eastern end was built over the original crypt. He built a new chapter house. The tower was rebuilt. The south nave arcade was rebuilt. The flying buttresses were added as a decorative feature. The north porch was removed. The baptistry was built in its place. Street built the adjacent Synod Hall, taking in the last remnant of St Michael and All Angels's Church, including the bell tower. The synod house is linked to the cathedral by Street's iconic covered footbridge. Roe spent over £230,000 at the time (over €26 million in 2006 terms). Further renovations were carried out, notably between 1980 and 1982.

Role
Christ Church is the centre of worship for the united dioceses and holds notable annual events such as the Citizenship Service. As the cathedral of the southern province of the Church of Ireland, it also hosts ordinations of priests and consecrations of bishops.

Architecture

Impact of the restoration
The extensive renovation in Victorian times preserved the seriously decayed structure from collapse, but it is now difficult to tell which parts of the interior are medieval and which parts are Victorian pastiche. Photographs of the exterior show the extent of the Victorian rebuilding: Archbishop de St Paul's 14th-century cathedral, in particular, the "long choir", was almost entirely destroyed. As a result, Christ Church is a mixture of surviving medieval and later church building.

Nave
The cathedral contains the reputed tomb of Strongbow, a medieval Norman-Welsh peer and warlord who came to Ireland at the request of King Diarmuid MacMorrough and whose arrival marked the beginning of Anglo-Norman involvement in Ireland. According to the Christ Church Cathedral website, in 1562 the nave roof vaulting collapsed and Strongbow's tomb was smashed; the current tomb is a contemporary replacement from Drogheda. As is well documented from a number of sources, the tomb of Strongbow was used as the venue for legal agreements from the 16th to the 18th centuries. Alongside the main tomb is a smaller figure with sloping shoulders, suggesting a female figure, but wearing chain mail, which may indicate that it was a child.

Crypt

Christ Church also contains the largest cathedral crypt (63.4m long) in Britain or Ireland, constructed in 1172–1173. Having been renovated in the early 2000s, it is now open for visitors.

The crypt contains various monuments and historical features, including:

 the oldest known secular carvings in Ireland, two carved statues that until the late 18th century stood outside the Tholsel (Dublin's medieval city hall, which was demolished in 1806) 
 a tabernacle and set of candlesticks which were used when the cathedral last operated (for a very short time) under the "Roman rite", when the Roman Catholic king, James II, having fled England in 1690, came to Ireland to fight for his throne and attended High Mass in the temporary restoration of Christ Church as a Roman Catholic cathedral.
 the stocks, formerly in Christ Church Place, made in 1670 and used for the punishment of offenders before the Court of the Dean's Liberty (the small area under the cathedral's exclusive civic authority), moved here in 1870
 historic books and altar goods of the Cathedral
 "The Cat & The Rat" are displayed with an explanatory note.

Chapter house
Behind the altar area, there is the chapter house, which contains cathedral offices, meeting rooms and other facilities.

Synod hall and bridge
At the west end of the cathedral is a fully integrated stone bridge, leading to the former synod hall, which was built on the site of St Michael's,  a prebendal church of Christ Church which was demolished by Street during his restoration of the cathedral. This hall, which incorporates the old St Michael's tower, was formerly used for hosting general synods and diocesan synods for Dublin, Glendalough and Kildare. It is now home to the "Dublinia" exhibition about medieval Dublin.

Status

Two cathedral issue 
For most of their common history, both Christ Church and St Patrick's held the status of cathedral for the Dublin diocese, a rare arrangement which only ended following the move to disestablish the Church of Ireland. In early times, there was considerable conflict over status but under the six-point agreement of 1300, Pacis Compositio, still extant, and in force until 1870:

 The consecration and enthronement of the Archbishop of Dublin was to take place at Christ Church – records show that this provision was not always followed, with many archbishops enthroned in both and at least two in St Patrick's only
 Christ Church had formal precedence, as the mother and senior cathedral of the diocese
 Christ Church was to retain the cross, mitre and ring of each deceased Archbishop of Dublin
 Deceased Archbishops of Dublin were to be buried alternately in each of the two cathedrals unless they personally willed otherwise
 The annual consecration of chrism oil for the diocese was to take place at Christ Church
 The two cathedrals were to act as one and shared equally in their freedoms

The 1868 Church Commissioners' report proposed making St Patrick's the sole cathedral and reducing Christ Church to a parish church.

Roman Catholicism 
To this day, the acting seat of the Roman Catholic Archbishop of Dublin, St Mary's, is known as a "pro-cathedral" in acknowledgement of the fact that the Holy See claims Christ Church as the rightful seat of the Roman Catholic archbishop.

Governance and staffing

Dean and chapter 

The dean and chapter, with the consent of the Archbishop of Dublin, preside over the cathedral, with the dean as "first among equals" in the chapter but holding a day-to-day authority, subject to the special roles of some other figures (the dean and chapter together are in a similar position to a rector of a parish).

The chapter comprises the dean, precentor (who must be skilled in music), chancellor, treasurer, Archdeacons of Dublin and Glendalough and 12 canons, eight being clergy of the Diocese of Dublin and four clergy of the Diocese of Glendalough (the three most senior in order of appointment are known as the Prebendary of St Michael's, Prebendary of St Michan's and the Prebendary of St John's).

The dean is appointed by the Archbishop of Dublin and, in an arrangement commenced in 1971, is also incumbent of the Christ Church Cathedral Group of Parishes, the day-to-day care of which is in the hands of a vicar appointed by a special board of patronage.

The dean can appoint a deputy and also appoints the cathedral verger. The dean and chapter together appoint the precentor, while the other members of the chapter are appointed by the archbishop.

Board 
Having been historically governed by its clerical chapter alone, since 1872 the cathedral has been operationally overseen by a board comprising nine clerical members (the dean, precentor, two clerical vicars and five other clerics) and nine lay members, elected every third annual Easter vestry. The board has the power to appoint and remove officers of the cathedral other than those whose appointment is vested in the archbishop, or the dean and chapter, or dean, to regulate salaries and to manage financial matters. The board is in a similar position to a select vestry of a parish.

The board has committees – mid-2007, these are administration and finance, culture (including the treasury), deanery, fabric, fundraising, health and safety, information technology, music, safeguarding trust and tower.

Administrative staff
The cathedral staff is led by the Dean. The Senior Management Team consists of the Dean's Vicar, Head of Education, Head of Finance, Head of Operations, Head of Tourism & Events, HR Manager and the Director of Music.

Other clergy 
There is a dean's vicar (and clerk of the chapter), a vicar of the Cathedral Group of Parishes and posts for a curate assistant and a student reader. There are also usually honorary clerical vicars.

Music 
Christ Church has a long musical history, with a well-known cathedral choir and a girls' choir. Along with the precentor, the musical side of its work is led by the "Organist and Director of Music", working with any assistant organist and organ scholar, as well as the "Honorary Keeper of the Music and Music Librarian" and, a "Music Development Officer".

List of organists

1595 John Fermor
1608 Thomas Bateson
1631 Randal Jewett
1639 Benjamin Rogers
1646 John Hawkshaw
1688 Thomas Godfrey
1689 Thomas Morgan
1692 Peter Isaac 
1694 Thomas Finell
1698 Daniel Roseingrave
1727 Ralph Roseingrave
1747 George Walsh
1765 Richard Woodward 
1777 Samuel Murphy      
1780 Langrishe Doyle
1805 William Warren
1816 Francis Robinson
1834 John Robinson
1844 Sir Robert Prescott Stewart
1894 John Horan
1906 James Fitzgerald
1913 Charles Herbert Kitson
1920 Thomas Henry Weaving
1950 Leslie Henry Bret Reed
1955 Arnold Thomas McKiernan
1980 Peter Sweeney  
1992 Mark Duley
2003 Judy Martin
2010 Judith Gannon (Locum)
2012 Ian Keatley
2020 Tom Little

Bells 

Christ Church Cathedral probably had at least one ringing bell from its foundation. By 1440 there were known to be three great bells in the tower; however, on 11 March 1597, an accidental gunpowder explosion on one of the nearby quays damaged the tower and caused the bells to crack. The effects of this blast also damaged the tower nearby of St. Audoen's Church.

In 1670, six new bells were cast for the tower from cannon metal. These were recast and augmented to eight in 1738 by Abel Rudhall. In the 1840s, several of the bells were recast by John Murphy of Dublin. In the 1860s and 1870s, the bells were gradually recast and augmented to twelve by John J Murphy, his son, with a tenor weight of 36 hundredweight in the key of B. The tenor was recast in 1979.

The most recent augmentation was in 1999 when an additional seven bells were added to the ring, giving a grand total of 20 bells - 19 swinging bells (the world's highest number of change ringing bells) and one chiming bell, cast by the Rudhalls. Although this does not produce a diatonic scale of 19 notes, it does uniquely provide a choice of combinations: three different 12-bell peals (in the keys of B, C# and F#) as well as 14 and 16-bell peals.  At the time of the augmentation, this was only the second 16 full circle bell peal in the world – St Martin-in-the-Bullring, Birmingham being the first.

They are regularly rung on tower tours and on Sunday for Sung Eucharist and Choral Evensong, with a ringing practice on Friday nights.

Archives and publications 
Christ Church has a range of historical archives and has arranged for a number of publications over the years, as well as maintaining a website since the 1990s. This work is overseen by the "Honorary Keeper of the Archives" and the "Web and e-mail Editor", along with the honorary secretary of Christ Church Publications, Ltd.

Friends 
The cathedral is supported by a voluntary group, the Friends of Christ Church Cathedral, founded in 1929. This group works with the cathedral authorities in a variety of ways.

Access 
As Christ Church receives no regular state support, while it welcomes all guests and has a chapel for those who simply wish to pray, there are fees for sightseeing, which can also be paid in combination with the purchase of a ticket for the neighbouring "Dublinia" exhibition. There is a gift shop with souvenirs, recordings of cathedral music groups and publications.

Media usage
In recent years the cathedral has been used as a set for medieval dramas such as the CW's drama Reign and The Tudors, the cathedral's longest-running television show. Many dresses and outfits worn by Maria Doyle Kennedy (playing Catherine of Aragon) and Jonathan Rhys Myers (King Henry VIII) can be viewed within the cathedral crypt.

Group of parishes 
In 1971, the general synod, following prior discussions, created the "Christ Church Cathedral Group of Parishes", uniting what were then four parishes with the cathedral, whose dean is their rector: St Andrew's, St Werburgh's, All Saints (Grangegorman) and St Michan's, St Paul and St Mary. The parishes are overseen day-to-day by a vicar appointed by a special board of patronage.

Burials
The heart of Lorcán Ua Tuathail (Saint Laurence O'Toole / Archbishop of Dublin)
Richard de Clare, 2nd Earl of Pembroke
John Comyn (archbishop)
Thomas Cartwright (bishop)
John Maxwell (archbishop)
Stephen de Fulbourn
John Parker (archbishop)
Thomas Lindsay (archbishop)
Henry Leslie (bishop)
St George Ashe
Welbore Ellis (bishop)
John Garvey (archbishop)
 John de St Paul (archbishop)
James Barry, 1st Baron Barry of Santry
James FitzGerald, 1st Duke of Leinster

Theft and recovery of the heart of Saint Laurence O'Toole
On 3 March 2012, the heart of Lorcán Ua Tuathail (Saint Laurence O'Toole, Archbishop of Dublin) was stolen from the cathedral. In April 2018, the heart was recovered in Phoenix Park, by Irish police following "an intelligence-led investigation".

Notes

References

See also
List of Gothic Cathedrals in Europe

Further reading
 G.E. Street & Edward Seymour, The cathedral of the Holy Trinity commonly called Christ Church cathedral, Dublin: an account of the restoration of the fabric ... with an historical sketch of the cathedral by Edward Seymour (London: Sutton Sharpe & Co., 1882), of which the architectural report was reproduced as ‘George Edmund Street’s account of the architecture of Christ Church Cathedral 1882, with commentary by Roger Stalley’ in Roger Stalley (ed.), George Edmund Street and the restoration of Christ Church Cathedral, Dublin (Dublin: Four Courts, 2000), text iii, 77-212.
 William Butler, The cathedral church of the Holy Trinity Dublin (Christ Church): a description of its fabric, and a brief history of the foundation, and subsequent changes (London, 1901), https://catalog.hathitrust.org/Record/005800580. 
 James Mills (ed.), Account roll of the priory of the Holy Trinity, Dublin, 1337-1346: with the middle English moral play ‘The pride of life’ (Dublin, 1891), https://archive.org/details/accountrollofpri00chri, reprinted with new introductions by James Lydon & Alan J. Fletcher, Dublin: Four Courts, 1996).
 [M.J. McEnery (ed.),] ‘Calendar to Christ church deeds, 1174-1684’ in Twentieth, twenty-third and twenty-fourth, indexed in twenty-seventh, reports of the deputy keeper of the public records in Ireland (Dublin, 1888 (https://archive.org/details/op1252289-1001, and now largely integrated into the new Virtual Record Treasury of Ireland,  http://virtualtreasury.ie), 1891, 1892, 1896), appendix 7, 36-122; appendix 3, 75-152; appendix 8, 100-94; appendix, 3-101 (index), reprinted with supplementary material for 1600-1700 and index, as M.J. McEnery & Raymond Refaussé (ed.), Christ Church deeds (Dublin: Four Courts, 2001).
 Raymond Gillespie (ed.), The proctor’s accounts of Peter Lewis 1564-1565 (Dublin: Four Courts Press, 1996).
 Raymond Gillespie (ed.), The first chapter act book of Christ Church cathedral, Dublin, 1574-1634  (Dublin: Four Courts Press, 1997).
 Raymond Refaussé with Colm Lennon (ed.) The registers of Christ Church cathedral, Dublin (Dublin: Four Courts Press, 1998).
 Barra Boydell (ed.), Music at Christ Church before 1800: documents and selected anthems (Dublin: Four Courts Press, 1999).
 Kenneth Milne (ed.), Christ Church Cathedral, Dublin: a history (Dublin: Four Courts Press, 2000).
 Stuart Kinsella (ed.). Augustinians at Christ Church: the canons regular of the cathedral priory of Holy Trinity, Dublin (Christ Church Studies, 1, Dublin: Christ Church Cathedral, 2000).
 Roger Stalley (ed.), George Edmund Street and the restoration of Christ Church cathedral, Dublin (Dublin: Four Courts Press, 2000).
 Joanna Wren, Floor tiles: A guide to the medieval and 19th century floor tiles of Christ Church cathedral, Dublin (Dublin: Christ Church Cathedral Publications, [2002]).
 Stuart Kinsella, Visitor’s guide: Christ Church cathedral Dublin (Dublin: Christ Church Cathedral Publications, 2003)
 Barra Boydell, A history of music at Christ Church cathedral, Dublin (Woodbridge: Boydell Press, 2004)
 Raymond Gillespie & Raymond Refaussé (ed.), The medieval manuscripts of Christ Church cathedral, Dublin (Dublin: Four Courts Press, 2006).
 Stuart Kinsella, Christ Church cathedral Dublin: a survey of monuments'' (Dublin: Christ Church Cathedral, 2010, revised 2015)

External links 

Official website
Bellringing in Christ Church Cathedral
Christ Church Cathedral (photograph gallery)

 
Dublin
Dublin
Diocese of Dublin and Glendalough
Burial sites of the FitzGerald dynasty
Bell towers in Ireland
Pre-Reformation Roman Catholic cathedrals
Former Roman Catholic church buildings
11th-century churches in Ireland